Corruption is a serious problem in Iran, being widespread, mostly in the government. Reformists and conservatives alike – routinely criticize corruption in the government.

Transparency International's 2022 ranking of corruption  among 180 countries, found Iran somewhat more corrupt than average -- 25 on a scale where 43 is average.

In the Islamic Republic
Transparency International's 2022 Corruption Perception Index, (which defines  corruption  as "abuse of entrusted  power for  personal  gain", and based on a "combination of at least 3 data sources drawn from 13 different corruption surveys and assessments. ... collected by a variety of reputable institutions, including the World Bank and the World Economic Forum"),  ranks  Iran 25 on a scale where 43 is average, the least corrupt  country (Denmark) is 90, and  the most  corrupt country (Somalia) is 12.

Problems  attributed to
As of 2019, corruption, nepotism, cronyism, (along with mismanagement and lack of "much needed" structural reforms), are blamed for country's economic shortcomings  such as the 50 to 70% of workers "in danger of falling into poverty",  lack of job creation, poor housing,  inflation, stagnating  incomes and unacceptable rates of poverty.
One of the objectives of the Iranian revolution was to have no social classes in Iran. Yet, Iran's Department of Statistics reports that 10 million Iranians live under the absolute poverty line and 30 million live under the relative poverty line. Iranian President Rouhani has linked social ills, including poverty and homelessness, to corruption. (These  problems have  often  been  attributed to  the  economic  sanctions imposed by the  U.S., but Hossein Raghfar, an economist at Tehran's Alzahra University, has suggested that they may be responsible for as little as 15% of Iran's economic  woes.) A study of income inequality (by Djavad Salehi-Isfahani)
found levels as discouragingly high  (a Gini coefficient of above 0.40)  in 2002, 20+ years after the revolution, as during the Shah's  time in 1972, "pointing to the lack of inclusive economic growth".
Corruption  or the uncovering of corruption has led to  unrest in the form of riots, strikes, anti-government demonstrations -- likely connected with the decline in economic growth corruption brings.

Characteristics
Ali Fathollah-Nejad describes an impediment to economic function and justice as a "political economy that favors regime loyalists ...  'insiders' (khodi) or those with access to state resources and privileges also enjoy privileged access to jobs."

According to Iran International, the privatization drive that began around 2007  led mainly not to efficiently run private firms competing for  business, but "quasi-governmental firms controlled by powerful insiders" who earn economic rent from activities such as blocking competition, "using public funds to stay afloat", "insider information to benefit from foreign exchange and gold price fluctuations when the government intervenes in the market", and circumventing sanctions to sell sanctioned goods at high prices.

An example of more straight up  corruption in the IRI (circa 1990s) comes from Nobel Peace Prize winner, Shirin Ebadi,  who gave up on the  practice of commercial law as a waste of time --  "What was the point of knowing case law and preparing a defense" when decisions were decided by bribes?

The Islamic Revolutionary Guard Corp has often been cited for its great power and privilege. According to Hooshangt Amirahmadi, director of the Center of Middle Eastern Sudies at Rutgers University, "A lot of ministers and governors are from the Revolutionary Guard .. They are using the money to buy loyalty and crate power bases."
Among the questionable activities the IRGC have engaged in are the operation of an "an illegal airport"  near Karaj City - discovered in 2005 -- where it imported and exported goods "without any oversight" . Also in 2005 it  stormed the new  Khomeini International Airport in Tehran and shut it down. allowing it to reopen under Revolutionary Guard management.

In 2016 then-President Mahmoud Ahmadinejad  vouched to fight "economic/oil Mafia" at all echelons of government. He   also proposed that lawmakers consider a bill, based on which the wealth and property of all officials who have held high governmental posts since 1979 could be investigated. Out of the $700 billion earned by the  state during the presidency of Ahmadinejad for the sale of oil, $150 billion could not be accounted for. 
On February 3, 2013, President Mahmoud Ahmadinejad played a video tape in the Iranian parliament that tied the heads of two branches of the government, the legislative and judiciary, to a documented financial corruption case related to the Larijani brothers.

Iranian Supreme Leader Ali  Khamenei has stated  that although there “are cases of corruption; it is not systematic” in Iran.
On the other hand, a Reuters special investigation found  Khamenei controls a massive financial empire built on property seizures worth $95 billion.

Causes
Some explanations suggested for  corruption in Iran by Mohammad Hossein Ziya,  include:
 lack of freedom of information  undermining the ability of independent media to expose corruption;
 lack of power among civil society and non-governmental organizations active in reporting and attempting to fight corruption; 
 the lack of transparency in   state-owned and semi-state-owned companies,;
  the so-called circumvention of sanctions, which involve a small group close to the government and who are major culprits in corruption.

Pahlavi Era
The Imperial State of Iran, the government of Iran during the Pahlavi dynasty, lasted from 1925 to 1979. Corruption was a serious problem during this period.

Stephanie Cronin of Oriental Institute, Oxford, describes corruption under the rule of Reza Shah as "large-scale". As oil prices rose in 1973, the scale of corruption also rose, particularly among the royal family, their partners and friends. According to Manouchehr Ganji who created a study group for Farah Pahlavi, Mohammad Reza Pahlavi was not sensitive to the issue, but addressed every now and then petty matters of low-ranking officials. As Ganji writes, the group submitted at least 30 solid reports within 13 years on corruption of high-ranking officials and the royal circle, but the Shah called the reports "false rumors and fabrications". Parviz Sabeti, a high-ranking official of SAVAK believed that the one important reason for the success of the regime's opposition is corruption.

According to a report of a journal associated with The Pentagon, "By 1977 the sheer scale of corruption had reached a boiling point.... Even conservative estimates indicate that such [bureaucratic] corruption involved at least a billion dollars between 1973 and 1976."

In Michel Foucault's view, corruption was the "glue" that kept the Pahlavi regime, despotism and modernization together.

After the revolution, the Central Bank of Iran published a list of 178 prominent individuals who had recently transferred over $2 billion out of the country, among them:
Jafar Sharif-Emami, some $31 million
Gholam Ali Oveisi, $15 million
Namazi, $9 million,
Nasser Moghadam, $2 million
"Mayor of Tehran", $6 million
"Minister of Health", $7 million
"Director of the National Iranian Oil Company", over $60 million

Corruption among the Royal family and court

Built up by forced sales and confiscations of estates, Reza Shah was "the richest man in Iran" and "left to his heir a bank account of some 3 million pounds and estates totalling over 3 million acres. A 1932 report of British Embassy in Tehran indicates that Reza Shah developed an "unholy interest in land" and jailed families until they agreed to sell their properties.

In the 1950s, Mohammad Reza Pahlavi founded Pahlavi Foundation (now Alavi Foundation) which "penetrated almost every corner of the nation's economy". Bostock and Jones unambiguously declared that Pahlavi Foundation a "nominally charitable foundation fostered official corruption". According to Houchang Chehabi and Juan Linz, Alavi foundation's $1.05 billion assets, $81 million capital and its declared devined $4.2 million was the "tip of the iceberg of official and dynastical corruption, outside and inside Iran".  The foundation, which was one of his main wealth sources alongside estates left from Reza Shah and Iran's oil revenue, was a tax haven for his holdings.

Many members of the Pahlavi clan were among the chief perpetrators of corruption in Iran. Royal court was described as "center of licentiousness and depravity, of corruption and influence peddling" in a mid-1970s CIA report. Prime Minister Amir Abbas Hoveyda who served from 1965 to 1977 had no choice but to facilitate or condone "the ubiquitous corruption of the Pahlavi Clan" and ignore "the corruption that saturated the regime".

In 1960, there were rumours that Princess Ashraf, Shah's twin sister was arrested in Geneva carrying a suitcase containing $2 million worth of heroin. She was regarded as Iran's main drug dealer until 1979. A 1976 CIA report declared that she has a "near legendary reputation for financial corruption" and her son Shahram controls some-twenty companies that serve as "cover for Ashraf's quasi-legal business ventures". Prince Hamid Reza, the Shah's half-brother, was ostracized from the royal family because of his widespread scandals of promiscuity, addiction and involvement in drug trade.

According to William Shawcross, hundreds of call girls from Madame Claude's establishment in Paris passed through Tehran for Mohammad Reza Shah and members of his court.

Impact on the 1979 revolution

Some scholars have raised the point that widespread corruption among officials and royal court led to the public dissatisfaction and helped the Iranian Revolution.

In Handbook of Crisis and Emergency Management, the Pahlavi dynasty is described as an example of governments losing legitimation because of corruption and facing a public service crisis as a result.
According to Fakhreddin Azimi, Professor of History at the University of Connecticut, "the unbridled misconduct of the Pahlavi clan undermined the Shah's proclaimed commitment to combating corruption and seriously damaged his credibility and Stature".

Right before the revolution, in a 1978 National TV appeal to the nation, Shah said :
 
I pledge that past mistakes, lawlessness, injustice, and corruption will not only no longer be repeated, but will in every respect be rectified... I guarantee that in future the government in Iran will be based on the Constitution, social justice, and the will of the people, and will be free from despotism, injustice, and corruption.
On the other hand, Khomeini repeatedly argued that the only way to eliminate corruption was through a revolution.

See also
Economy of Iran
Crime in Iran
Smuggling in Iran
Fuel smuggling in Iran
History of the Islamic Republic of Iran
Aghazadeh
Notable cases
Banking cases
2011 Iranian embezzlement scandal
Fatemi Circle
Shahram Jazayeri
Marjan Sheikholeslami Aleagha
Mahafarid Amir Khosravi
Mahmoud Reza Khavari
Mehdi Hashemi Rafsanjani
Babak Zanjani
Institutions in charge of fighting corruption
General Inspection Office
Supreme Audit Court of Iran
Islamic Revolutionary Court

References

Abbas Milani. Eminent Persians, Syracuse University Press, 2008, 
Stephanie Cronin. The Making of Modern Iran: State and Society under Riza Shah, 1921-1941, Routledge, 2012, 
William Shawcross. The Shah's Last Ride, Simon & Schuster, 1989, 
Ali Farazmand. Handbook of Crisis and Emergency Management. CRC Press, 2001, 
Ervand Abrahamian. Iran Between Two Revolutions. Princeton University Press, 1982, 
Ervand Abrahamian. A History of Modern Iran, Cambridge University Press, 2008, 
Fakhreddin Azimi. Quest for democracy in Iran: a century of struggle against authoritarian rule. Harvard University Press, 2009, 
Richard Morrock. The Psychology of Genocide and Violent Oppression: A Study of Mass Cruelty from Nazi Germany to Rwanda. McFarland & Company, 2010, 
Manouchehr Ganji, Defying the Iranian Revolution: From a Minister to the Shah to a Leader of Resistance, Greenwood Publishing Group, 2002, 
The Pahlavi Dynasty: An Entry from Encyclopedia of the World of Islam. Edited by Gholamali Haddad Adel, Mohammad Jafar Elmi, Hassan Taromi-Rad. EWI Press, 2012, 
Houchang E. Chehabi, Juan J. Linz. Sultanistic Regimes, Johns Hopkins University Press, 1998, 
Sandra Mackey. The Iranians: Persia, Islam and the Soul of a Nation, Penguin Group, 1996, 
Desmond Harney. The Priest and the King: An Eyewitness Account of the Iranian Revolution, I.B. Tauris, 1999, 
Janet Afary and Kevin B. Anderson. Foucault and the Iranian Revolution: Gender and the Seductions of Islamism, University of Chicago Press, 2010, 
Mohammad Gholi Majd. Resistance to the Shah: Landowners and Ulama in Iran, University Press of Florida, 2000, 

 
Politics of Iran
Iran
Government of the Islamic Republic of Iran